Tombokoirey II is a rural commune in Niger.

References

Communes of Niger